The Beverton Medal is a prestigious. international fish biology and/or fisheries science prize awarded annually. It is awarded to a distinguished scientist for a lifelong contribution to all aspects of the study of fish biology and/or fisheries science, with a focus on ground-breaking research. The medal was established as the highest award of the Fisheries Society of the British Isles (FSBI) to recognize distinction in the field of fish biology and fisheries science, to raise the profile of the discipline and of the Society in the wider scientific community. Medals are awarded to individuals who have made an outstanding contribution to fish biology and/or fisheries. 
The Beverton Medal is traditionally awarded in July at the Fisheries Society of the British Isles annual international conference.

The first medal was awarded to Ray Beverton. In his honour, the medal is now known as the Beverton Medal. In 2017, to mark the 50th anniversary of the Fisheries Society of the British Isles (FSBI) the medal was awarded to Ray's collaborator Sidney Holt, having together written the book On the Dynamics of Exploited Fish Populations in 1957

Medallists
Source: FSBI
2021 - Daniel Pauly
2020 - Beth Fulton
2019 - Neil B. Metcalfe
2018 - Gary Carvahlo
2017 - Sidney Holt
2016 - Lennart Persson
2015 - Ian Cowx
2014 - Alexander (Sandy) Scot
2013 - Felicity Huntingford
2012 - Charles Tyler
2011 - Imantes (Monty) Priede
2010 - Tony Farrell
2009 - Peter Maitland
2008 - Paul J.B. Hart
2007 - Richard Mann (M.B.E.)
2006 - Anne Magurran
2005 - J.P. Sumpter
2004 - A. Ferguson
2003 - Tony J. Pitcher
2002 - J.E. Thorpe
2001 - H. Bern
2000 - Rosemary Lowe-McConnell
1999 - J.M. Elliott
1998 - J.H.S. Blaxter
1997 - E. Houde
1996 - E.D. Le Cren
1995 - Ray Beverton

See also

 List of biology awards

References

Biology awards

Fisheries science
British science and technology awards
Awards established in 1995